Agromyces albus is a bacterium from the genus of Agromyces which has been isolated from the plant Androsace.

References 

Microbacteriaceae
Bacteria described in 2003